Frank Perrin is a French artist based in Paris who has spent the last ten years exploring the notion of Postcapitalism and compiling a compendium of our contemporary obsessions. 
From Joggers,  and Yachts to Fashion Shows Postcapitalism is a metaphysical flipbook of the fundamental ideas of our era, where each photography becomes a new landscape of the unconscious and desires of today.

Frank Perrin was formerly a philosophy teacher and an art critic. He started the photographic series of the Joggers in 1998 and the Fashion Shows in 2003. After founding the art review «Bloc Notes» in the early 1990s he began taking photographs. He is also the founding director of Crash Magazine.  Frank Perrin's work was featured in the Daelim Museum, Seoul, Korea at Contemporary Art Museum les abattoirs Toulouse, and recently new works at Centre Pompidou Metz and Shirn Kunsthalle Francfort.

References

French contemporary artists
Year of birth missing (living people)
Living people